USPHL may refer to:

The UN/LOCODE geographic code for the United States city of Philadelphia
United States Premier Hockey League, an American junior ice hockey league